The funding of Hezbollah comes from Lebanese business groups, private persons, businessmen, the Lebanese diaspora involved in African diamond exploration, other Islamic groups and countries, and the taxes paid by the Shia Lebanese. Hezbollah says that the main source of its income comes from its own investment portfolios and donations by Muslims.

Western sources maintain that Hezbollah receives most of its financial, training, weapons, explosives, political, diplomatic, and organizational aid from Iran and Syria. Iran is said to have given $400 million between 1983 and 1989 through donation. The situation changed due to economic problems, but Iran still funds humanitarian efforts carried on by Hezbollah. According to reports released in February 2010, Hezbollah received $400 million from Iran. In 2011, Iran earmarked $7 million to Hezbollah's activities in Latin America. Hezbollah also receives financial and political assistance, as well as weapons and training, from Iran. Iranian support to Hezbollah has varied over the years, but as of 2018 US officials estimate Iran transfers $700 million annually.

Hezbollah has relied also on funding from the Shi'ite Lebanese Diaspora in West Africa, the United States and, most importantly, the Triple Frontier, or tri-border area, along the junction of Paraguay, Argentina, and Brazil. U.S. law enforcement officials have identified an illegal multimillion-dollar cigarette-smuggling fund raising operation and a drug smuggling operation. However, Nasrallah has repeatedly denied any links between the South American drug trade and Hezbollah, calling such accusations "propaganda" and attempts "to damage the image of Hezbollah".

International sanctions
As at October 2019, Hezbollah is subject to sanctions from a number of countries and international organisations that seek to stop funding to designated terrorist organisations, that includes Hezbollah. Banks, including Lebanese banks, are required to comply with these sanctions. Banks that deal with parties that provide funds for Hezbollah (or other terrorist organisation) are liable to be barred from dealing in dollars, besides other sanctions.

The countries that ban transfers of funds to Hezbollah include: Argentina, Australia, Canada, Egypt, Israel, Japan, New Zealand, Paraguay, Saudi Arabia, United Arab Emirates, United Kingdom (partly), and the United States. Germany and the European Union outlawed only Hezbollah's military wing, and work with Hezbollah's political wing and allow it to raise funds in Europe.

The United States has accused members of the Venezuelan government of providing financial aid to Hezbollah. According to the testimony of a former Assistant Secretary of State for Western Hemisphere Affairs, Roger Noriega, Hugo Chávez's government gave "indispensable support" to Iran and Hezbollah in the Western Hemisphere. In an article by the conservative think tank the American Enterprise Institute, Noriega explained how two witnesses alleged that Ghazi Atef Nassereddine, a Venezuelan diplomat in Syria, was an operative of Hezbollah who used Venezuelan entities to launder money for Hezbollah with President Nicolás Maduro's personal approval.

In January 2022, the U.S. Department of the Treasury's Office of Foreign Assets Control (OFAC) designated Hezbollah-affiliated financial facilitator Adnan Ayad, as well as members of an international network of facilitators and companies connected to him and to Adel Diab - Dyad's business partner. Dyad - a fellow Hezbollah financier who was also added by the OFAC to the Specially Designated Nationals (SDN) list.

Money laundering

Hezbollah has been accused of engaging in various illegal activities for the purpose of securing funds for its own activities. For example, Matthew Levitt told a committee of the US Senate that Hezbollah engages in a "wide variety of criminal enterprises" worldwide in order to raise funds. The U.S. Treasury Department has accused Hezbollah of raising funds by counterfeiting U.S. currency.  In 2008, the United States Drug Enforcement Administration launched Project Cassandra to track and undercut fundraising via illicit drugs.

Hezbollah has categorically denied all allegations of drug trafficking, illegal banking and money laundering. In a statement in 2011, the party said "The United States' allegations that Hezbollah is funding its activities illegitimately is merely another attempt to tarnish the image of the resistance in Lebanon ... after the failure and exposure of U.S. intelligence operations in our country". In a 2012 speech, Secretary General Hassan Nasrallah said "Time and again they speak about the drug networks in Latin America and Europe and they say Hezbollah is financing these activities. This is forbidden for us." Al-Akhbar Newspaper argued that there is no evidence supporting the claim of Hezbollah's drug trafficking because no court have been provided evidence for that claim

Asia and Middle East 
In the Golden Triangle region of South-East Asia, Hezbollah generates funding with the heroin trade and reportedly the smuggling of rare or precious items or materials. Mohammed Raad, at one time leader of Loyalty to the Resistance Bloc, said money from Iran came only through private charities to be used for health care, education and the support of war widows. Hezbollah's main sources of income, he said, are the party's investment portfolios and wealthy Shiites.

Lebanon 
In July 2014, The Daily Beast reported that Hezbollah owns marijuana plantations and produces Hashish in the Bekaa Valley, in eastern Lebanon, and exports the produce to countries such as Iraq, Jordan and Syria. Prior to the Syrian civil war, the Lebanese Army patrolled the fields, though the Lebanese government has recently adopted a laissez-faire attitude towards illegal drug production. According to Arab media reports, Hezbollah has a number of Lebanese front companies that deal in counterfeit medicine.

Hezbollah is known to be involved in the Cocaine trade, and the Hashish trade. Hezbollah uses the drug trade as well as other "criminal enterprises" to fund its military excursions in Lebanon, while some of their funds go to education and health assistance for the poor.

In September 2020, the U.S. Department of the Treasury's Office of Foreign Assets Control (OFAC) sanctioned two Lebanese ministers Ali Hassan Khalil and Yusuf Finyanus, due to their "material support to Hezbollah" and other corruption charges. It also sanctioned Lebanon-based Arch Consulting and Meamar Construction for being owned, controlled, or directed by Hezbollah, in addition to Hezbollah Executive Council official Sultan Khalifah Asaad.

Europe 
On January 9, 2010, Der Spiegel reported that drug dealers, on behalf of Hezbollah, transfer millions to Lebanese groups via European narcotics transactions.

In November 2018, following an investigation by the U.S. Drug Enforcement Administration (DEA) called “Operation Cedar”, Lebanese nationals, accused of having links to Hezbollah went on trial for laundering millions of euros in South American drug money to Europe and Lebanon.
According to a research  conducted by the Abba Eban Institute as part of an Initiative called Janus, some of the individuals arrested in “Operation Cedar” were Hezbollah operatives involved in money laundering and narcotics trafficking. The research also found that Hezbollah is financed through non-profit organizations such as the “Orphans Project Lebanon”, a German-based charity for Lebanese orphans. It found that it had been donating portions of its contributions to a foundation which finances the families of Hezbollah members who commit suicide bombings.
The European Foundation for Democracy published that the “Orphans Project Lebanon” organization directly channels financial donations from Germany to the Lebanese Al-Shahid Association, which is part of the Hezbollah network and promotes suicide bombings in Lebanon, particularly among children. In Germany, financial donations to the Orphans Project Lebanon are tax-deductible and thus subsidized by the German State's tax policy.

Latin America

Colombia 
On October 21, 2008, the Los Angeles Times reported that an international cocaine smuggling and money laundering ring with alleged connections to Hezbollah was dismantled in Colombia. It is claimed that 12% of the group's profits went to fund Hezbollah, although no dollar figure was specified. A separate report claimed that the joint operations between the United States and Colombia resulted in the arrest of nearly 130 individuals suspected of being members of a cell formed from an alliance among a famous Colombian drug syndicate known as "North Valley", an armed leftist militant organisation composed by former and current members of FARC, and a group of smugglers of Lebanese origin. Two years before, the United States and Colombia had launched a joint investigation, known by the operational codename "Titan", with the goal of pursuing networks that smuggled drugs from Colombia to the US, Europe and the Middle East. The investigation soon centred on the leader of the "North Valley" group, an individual of Lebanese origin called "Shukri Harb." Harb's network supplied 12 per cent of its revenues in cash directly to Hezbollah.

A June 25, 2009 article published by the Jamestown Foundation, a Washington, D.C. think tank, reported on the allegations connecting Hezbollah to drug trafficking and money laundering incidents in Curaçao in April 2009 and previous incidents linking Hezbollah to cocaine and money laundering rings dismantled in Colombia and 2008 and a similar ring dismantled in June 2005.  The article takes a critical approach to these allegations by questioning the veracity of accusations linking Hezbollah to the drug trade in the Americas. The article also reported that Lebanese organized crime groups are likely to be responsible for drug-related activities in the region and that solid evidence proving the Hezbollah angle to drug-related activities never emerges.

Mexico 
Other sources of Hezbollah funding became evident during a review of the Lebanese-Mexican smuggling network that smuggled 200 illegal Lebanese immigrants in the United States of America. Specifically, after Mahmoud Youssef Kourani, a Lebanese who infiltrated into the United States through the Lebanese-Mexican smuggling network was captured, Mahmound Youssef Kourani admitted spending part of his time in the United States raising money to support Hezbollah—at least $40,000, according to an FBI affidavit. A further check of court records indicated that Kourani told the FBI his brother is the group's (Hezbollah) chief of military security in southern Lebanon.

Venezuela 
Members of the Bolivarian Venezuelan government have also been accused of providing financial aid to Hezbollah by the United States Department of the Treasury and according to the testimony of a former Assistant Secretary of State for Western Hemisphere Affairs of the United States Department of State Roger Noriega, Hugo Chávez's government gave "indispensable support" to Iran and Hezbollah in the Western Hemisphere. In an article by the conservative think tank American Enterprise Institute, Noriega explained how two witnesses alleged that Ghazi Atef Nassereddine, a Venezuelan diplomat in Syria, was an operative of Hezbollah who used Venezuelan entities to launder money for Hezbollah with President Nicolas Maduro's personal approval.

In a study by the Center for a Secure Free Society (SFS), at least 173 people from the Middle East were caught with Venezuelan documentation. The majority passed through Caracas security improperly and traveled to Canada. The SFS states that the Venezuelan government has been instrumental in providing documents to "Iran and other extremists seeking to enter North America without being detected. According to Joseph Humire, Executive Director of SFS, those caught were from "Iran, Iraq, Syria, Jordan and Lebanon" and that "most were from Iran, Lebanon and Syria. 70% came from those countries and had some connection with Hezbollah". The majority allegedly had Venezuelan passports, IDs, visas and in some cases, even Venezuelan birth certificates. Anthony Daquin, former security advisor involved in the modernization of the Venezuelan identity system stated in the report that the Venezuelan government will "be able to issue the Venezuelan document without any problem, from the University of Computer Sciences, because they have the equipment and supplies, including polycarbonate sheets, electronic signature that goes into passports and encryption certificates, which are those that allow the chip to be read at the airports". One of the key figures of the Venezuelan government noted in the SFS report was the Lebanese born former Minister of the Interior, Tarek El Aissami, who allegedly "developed a sophisticated financial network and multi-level networks as a criminal-terrorist pipeline to bring Islamic militants to Venezuela and neighboring countries, and to send illicit funds from Latin America to the Middle East". The "pipeline" consists of 40 shell companies which have bank accounts in Venezuela, Panama, Curaçao, St. Lucia, Miami and Lebanon. Tarek El Aissami's father Zaidan El Amin El Aissami, who is also known as Carlos Zaidan, was a military associate of Saddam Hussein.

North America 
In 2011, the United States Treasury designated Lebanese Canadian Bank a "primary money laundering concern" for its role in money laundering for Hezbollah funder and drug kingpin Ayman Joumaa. The US Treasury banned LCB from dealing in dollars, resulting in the sale of the bank.

Operation Smokescreen identified an illegal multimillion-dollar cigarette smuggling fundraising operation in the United States. Mohammed Hammoud was convicted in the United States for "violating a ban on material support of groups designated as terrorist organizations". The amount was US$3,500, which Hammoud claimed was to "support Hezbollah's efforts to distribute books at schools and improve public water systems."

Military funding

Iran 
Hezbollah has also received Iranian-supplied weaponry, including 11,500 missiles already in place in southern Lebanon. 3,000 Hezbollah militants have undergone training in Iran, which included guerrilla warfare, firing missiles and rocket artillery, operating unmanned drones, naval warfare, and conventional war operations.

Mahmoud Ali Suleiman, the Hezbollah operative captured in August 2006 by the IDF for his role in the kidnapping of two Israeli soldiers in a cross-border raid on July 12, admitted during his interrogation that he received weapons-training and religious instruction in Iran. He told his interrogators that he rode in a civilian car to Damascus, from where he flew to Iran. Other than the Russian-made Katyusha, Hezbollah's reported artillery cache is entirely Iranian-made.

On August 4, 2006, Jane's Defence Weekly, a defense industry magazine, reported that Hezbollah asked Iran for "a constant supply of weapons to support its operations against Israel" in the 2006 Israel-Lebanon conflict. The report cited Western diplomatic sources as saying that Iranian authorities promised Hezbollah a steady supply of weapons "for the next stage of the confrontation".

Iran long denied supplying Hezbollah with weapons, despite persistent reports to the contrary. However, "Mohtashami Pur, a one-time ambassador to Lebanon who currently holds the title of secretary-general of the 'Intifada conference,' told an Iranian newspaper that Iran transferred the missiles to the Shi'ite militia, adding that Hezbollah has his country's blessing to use the weapons in defense of Lebanon". The Israel Defense Forces regard Hezbollah as virtually an arm of the Iranian armed forces; a senior Israeli defence official told Jane's Defence Weekly that "we should consider that what we are facing in Lebanon is not a militia but rather a special forces brigade of the Iranian Army."  In an interview in 2007, Hezbollah Deputy Secretary-General Naim Kassem told the Iranian Arabic-language TV station al-Qawthar that all suicide bombings and other operations in Lebanon must be approved by the ayatollahs in Tehran; in 2008 Iran issued a stamp commemorating a recently killed Hezbollah leader.

As of 2018, annual Iranian monetary support for Hezbollah is estimated at 700 million dollars according to US estimates.

Syria 
Similar claims and denials regarding supply of weapons have been made with respect to Syria. Many have accused Syria of funneling the weapons to Hezbollah from its border with Lebanon. Hassan Khalil, a top political adviser to Nasrallah, said that the group "firmly opposes the supervision of the Syrian-Lebanese border," adding that "Hezbollah has enough weapons to defend Lebanon against [an] Israeli aggression, even if borders with Syria are completely closed".

Iraq 
Due to a modification of terrorist funding laws the U.S. government placed financial sanctions on an Iraqi military leader named Al-Zaydi who allegedly was linked to Hezbollah financial activities and military support which was coordinated by Iran.

Qatar 
A private security contractor, Jason G., claimed that Qatar sponsored Hezbollah as early as 2017, in which he was offered €750,000 by Abdulrahman bin Mohammed Sulaiman al-Khulaifi, Qatar's ambassador to Belgium, to hush up the supply of money and weapons to the organization.

In September 2021, the Department of the Treasury's Office of Foreign Assets Control (OFAC) and the government of Qatar conducted a joint operation to uncover and sanction a financing network used by Hezbollah, a designated foreign terrorist organization based in Arabian Peninsula. According to the United States, Hezbollah abused the international financial system and announced that the U.S. will protect the international financial systems from terrorist abuse and cooperate with their partners like Qatar.

References

Hezbollah

es:Fundación de Hezbolá